Scott Montgomery may refer to:

Scott Montgomery (poker player) (born 1981), Canadian poker player
Scott L. Montgomery (born 1951), geologist

See also
Montgomery Scott, Star Trek character known as Scotty